We Best Love, also known as WBL, is a Taiwanese television drama series produced by Result Entertainment for the streaming service WeTV. It chronicles the star-crossed romance between two male classmates, Gao Shi-de (Sam Lin) and Zhou Shu-yi (Yang Yu-teng).

The first season, titled "No. 1 For You" (lit. "Forever No. 1"), premiered on January 8, 2021 and streamed for six episodes with one special episode. The second season "Fighting Mr. 2nd" (lit. "No. 2's Counterattack"), set five years after the events of the first season, premiered on March 5, 2021.

We Best Love: Special Edition, a director's cut of the series, premiered on June 25, 2021.

It was featured on Teen Vogue's best BL dramas of 2021 list.

Premise
The series follows the romance of Gao Shi-de and Zhou Shu-yi as they navigate the misunderstandings that threaten to destroy their relationship.

Cast and characters
Sam Lin as Gao Shide: Zhou Shuyi's classmate who will do whatever it takes to take the number one spot from Shuyi to keep his attention. 
 Yang Yu Teng as Zhou Shuyi: the ambitious son of a wealthy Japanese businessman who is irritated at Gao Shide for always being one step above him in every aspect of his school and personal life
Ray Chang as Pei Shouyi: Gao Shide's older cousin with an affective disorder who works as a school doctor
Shih Chihtian as Yu Zhenxuan: Gao Shide's coworker with Asperger's who has had a history with Pei Shouyi
Richard Lee as Shi Zheyu: Gao Shide and Zhou Shuyi's classmate
Evan Luo as Liu Bingwei: Shi Zheyu's classmate who has a crush on him
Zack Fanchiang as Fang Zhengwen: Zhou Shuyi's childhood best friend
Belle Hsin as Jiang Yuxin: Zhou Shuyi's first crush who ends up dating his best friend
Helena Hsu as Gao Shide's mother
Eriku Yoza as Zhou Shuyi's father

Seasons

"No. 1 For You"
The feeling of being pressed down has never felt so real for Zhou Shuyi. As he stares at the class report, he can't help but to wonder why he's been in second place ever since Gao Shide came into his life in the fifth grade. For this reason, he's excited to leave for college, hoping to never see Gao Shide again. Enjoying his new life in college, he joins the swimming team and is revered by his classmates, that is until Gao Shide enters his life again and swims into first place on his last swimming competition before graduation. Zhou Shuyi doesn't understand why Gao Shide is following him wherever he went, but little does he know that Gao Shide has always had eyes for him.

"Fighting Mr. 2nd"
Set five years after the events of the first season, Gao Shide is now the CEO of his family's start-up company, which is facing the threat of being bought out. The buyer's representative is no other than Zhou Shuyi, who hates him for their unresolved separation. Zhou Shuyi may always be second during school, but when his career is on the line, he has no reason to lag behind.

Literature
On March 3, 2021, Result Entertainment released a novelization of the first season, No. 1 For You, written by Yu Chen-huan and published by Sharp Point Press. The novelization of the second season was released on April 15, 2021. Both novels came with unreleased scenes that did not make it to the final cut, as well as interviews with the actors. Photobooks for each season were also released, sold separately from the novels.

References

External links
 
 

2020s LGBT-related drama television series
2020s Taiwanese television series
2020s teen drama television series
Taiwanese drama television series
Taiwanese boys' love television series
Mandarin-language television shows
Television shows set in Taiwan
Taiwanese LGBT-related web series